Alling is a surname. Notable people with the surname include:

Alexander M. Alling (New York), a member of the 70th New York State Legislature
Alexander M. Alling (Wisconsin), a member of the Wisconsin State Assembly
Lillian Alling, Eastern European hiker
Morgan Alling (born 1968), Swedish actor, screenwriter and film and theatre director